Vulture Street is a road in Brisbane, Queensland, Australia. It connects the inner southern suburbs. Its eastern segment is known as Vulture Street East.

Geography
Vulture Street commences at a junction with Montague Road, West End and then travels east through West End, South Brisbane, Kangaroo Point and East Brisbane, where it terminates at a junction at Stanley Terrace being unable to go further east due to Norman Creek. It is known as Vulture Street East from east of the intersection with Wellington Road in East Brisbane.

Significant landmarks and junctions

Vulture Street has a number of significant landmarks and junctions, including (from west to east):
 24: West End State School
 150: Brisbane State High School
 intersection with Gladstone Road and Ernest Street
 160: St Andrews Anglican Church
 overbridge across the Beenleigh and Cleveland railway lines
 253: Somerville House 
 South Brisbane Memorial Park
 263: South Brisbane Town Hall (now owned by Somerville House)
 intersection with Stanley Street
 former South Brisbane Library
 Mater Private Hospital
 overbridge across the Pacific Motorway
 330: St Nicholas Russian Orthodox Cathedral
 intersection with Main Street
 The Brisbane Cricket Ground, more commonly known as the Gabba
 East Brisbane State School
 intersection with Wellington Road (becomes Vulture Street East)
 554: St Paul's Anglican Church

In popular culture
The rock band Powderfinger produced an album Vulture Street which was named after the band's first recording studio in Vulture Street, West End.

References

Roads in Brisbane
West End, Queensland
South Brisbane, Queensland
Kangaroo Point, Queensland
East Brisbane, Queensland